Marc Minkowski (born 4 October 1962) is a French conductor of classical music, especially known for his interpretations of  French Baroque works, is the current general director of Opéra national de Bordeaux.Marc was musical director of Mozartwoche in Salzburg, Austria, 2013-2017 History mother, Mary Anne (Wade), is American, and his father was Alexandre Minkowski, a Polish-French professor of pediatrics and one of the founders of neonatology. Marc Minkowski is a Chevalier du Mérite.

Life and career
Marc Minkowski was born in Paris. His maternal grandmother, Edith Wade, was a violinist. He began his musical career as a bassoonist for René Clemencic's Clemencic Consort and Philippe Pierlot's Ricercar Consort.

In 1982, Minkowski formed "Les Musiciens du Louvre", an orchestra dedicated to showcasing French Baroque music which has championed works by Marin Marais (opera Alcyone), Jean-Joseph Mouret (opera Les amours de Ragonde), Marc-Antoine Charpentier, Jean-Baptiste Lully (opera Phaëton at Opéra National de Lyon) and Jean-Philippe Rameau (opera Hippolyte et Aricie). The ensemble has also revived lesser-known Handel operas, such as Teseo, Amadigi, Riccardo Primo and Ariodante, as well as several operas by Christoph Willibald Gluck including Armide (at the Centre de Musique Baroque de Versailles), Alceste and Iphigénie en Tauride (at the English Bach Festival at the Royal Opera House, Covent Garden).

Les Musiciens du Louvre relocated to Grenoble after 1996, where they are associates at the Maison de la Culture de Grenoble.

Minkowski's career focus has shifted from an initial specialized interest in the Baroque to a wider interest in opera. He conducted Mozart's Idomeneo in 1996 at the Opéra National de Paris and debuted his Die Entführung aus dem Serail at the Salzburg Festival. He has since conducted Mozart's Le Nozze di Figaro at the Festival d'Aix-en-Provence and Mitridate, re di Ponto at the Salzburg Festival, Handel's Giulio Cesare in Amsterdam, Paris and Zürich (with Cecilia Bartoli) and his Il Trionfo del Tempo e del Disinganno in Zürich, Donizetti's La Favorite in Zürich, and Gluck's Iphigénie en Tauride, among others.

He has also performed and recorded critically acclaimed works by Jacques Offenbach: Orphée aux Enfers, La belle Hélène and La Grande-Duchesse de Gérolstein, along with the Concerto militaire for cello and orchestra in G, with Jérôme Pernoo (cello).

As well as Les Musiciens du Louvre, Minkowski is active in the Mahler Chamber Orchestra, the Berlin Philharmonic, Orchestre de Paris, the Los Angeles Philharmonic, the Mozarteum Salzburg and the Staatskapelle Dresden. In 2008 Minkowski became music director of Sinfonia Varsovia.

His recordings can be found on Erato, EMI's Virgin Classics and Naïve Records. In 2014 Naïve released a recording of the original version of Der fliegende Holländer and the first recording of Le Vaisseau fantôme by Dietsch, conducted by Minkowski.

Marc Minkowski was awarded the Prize XVIIe in 1988 for his recordings of Lully-Molière : Les Comédies ballets par les Musiciens du Louvre, (Erato Records).

References

External links
 Minkowski at Deutsche Grammophon
 Les Musiciens du Louvre
 
Marc Minkowski Official Website

French male conductors (music)
French performers of early music
1962 births
Living people
Musicians from Paris
French classical bassoonists
French people of Polish-Jewish descent
French people of American descent
Knights of the Ordre national du Mérite
Handel Prize winners
21st-century French conductors (music)
21st-century French male musicians
Erato Records artists